A Night at Boomers, Vol. 2 (partially reissued on the compilation CD Naima - Recorded Live at Boomer's NYC ) is a live album by pianist Cedar Walton recorded in 1973 and released on the Muse label.

Reception
Allmusic awarded the album 4½ stars.

Track listing 
All compositions by Cedar Walton except as indicated
 "Naima" (John Coltrane) - 7:49  
 "Stella by Starlight" (Ned Washington, Victor Young) -  
 "All the Way" (Sammy Cahn, Jimmy Van Heusen) - 5:08   
 "I'll Remember April" (Gene de Paul, Patricia Johnston, Don Raye) - 11:06   
 "Blue Monk" (Thelonious Monk) - 11:50
 " Bleecker Street Theme" - 1:03

Personnel 
Cedar Walton - piano 
Clifford Jordan - tenor saxophone (tracks 2 & 4-6)
Sam Jones - bass
Louis Hayes - drums

References 

Cedar Walton live albums
1973 live albums
Muse Records live albums
Albums produced by Don Schlitten